Euphoria is the second studio album by Swedish psychedelic rock band Dead Man, released on March 31, 2008 by Crusher Records and Meteor City. The album received good reviews by Spin and Metal Review to name a few.

Track listing
"Today" – 5:08
"High or Low" – 3:40
"Footsteps" – 5:30
"I Must Be Blind" – 5:05
"From A Window" – 0:56
"Light Vast Corridors" – 2:40
"The Wheel" – 9:13
"Rest In Peace" – 8:51
"A Pinch of Salt" – 3:30
"Euphoria" – 3:50
"July" – 1:36 (CD-only bonus track)

Personnel
Dead Man  
Guitar, Mandolin, Percussion, Vocals - Kristoffer Sjödahl 
Guitar, Percussion, Vocals - Johan Rydholm
Bass, Synthesizer, Organ, Guitar, Vocals - Joakim Dimberg 
Drums, Percussion, Vocals - Marcus Allard 
Additional Personnel
Engineer - Daniel Ruud 
Artwork By - Fredrik Fogelqvist
Mastered By - Henryk Lipp 
Producer - Daniel Ruud, Dead Man
Steel Guitar - Anders Haglund 
Violin, Flute - Mats Gavell

References

External links
 

2008 albums
Dead Man (band) albums